Slavoj Černý (4 March 1937 – 31 December 2020) was a Czech cyclist. He competed in the team pursuit at the 1960 Summer Olympics.

References

External links
 

1937 births
2020 deaths
Czech male cyclists
Olympic cyclists of Czechoslovakia
Cyclists at the 1960 Summer Olympics
People from Bílina
Sportspeople from the Ústí nad Labem Region